Laclede is an unincorporated community in Bonner County, Idaho, United States. Laclede is located on U.S. Route 2 at the intersection of Riley Creek and the Pend Oreille (pronounced Pond O'Ray) River. Laclede has a post office with ZIP code 83841.

Laclede is surrounded by forested lands. The Riley Creek Recreation Area and Pend Oreille Wildlife Management Area lie one mile (1.6 km) SW of Laclede. The Laclede Mill, a part of the Idaho Forest Group, is in Laclede, producing Douglas fir, Cedar, and White Pine woods for export worldwide.

History
A post office called Laclede has been in operation since 1901. The community bears the name of a French Canadian pioneer, Pierre Laclède,

Laclede's population was estimated at 150 in 1909, and was also 150 in 1960.

Education
Children in the community attend Priest River schools.

References

External links

Unincorporated communities in Bonner County, Idaho
Unincorporated communities in Idaho